Titanium butoxide is an metal-organic chemical compound with the formula Ti(OBu)4 (Bu = CH2CH2CH2CH3). It is a colorless odorless liquid, although aged samples are yellowish with a weak alcohol-like odor. It is soluble in many organic solvents. It hydrolyzes to give titanium dioxide, which allows deposition of TiO2 coatings of various shapes and sizes down to the nanoscale.

Structure and synthesis

Like most titanium alkoxides (exception: titanium isopropoxide), Ti(OBu)4 is not a monomer but exists as a cluster (see titanium ethoxide).  Nonetheless it is often depicted as a simple monomer.

It is produced by treating titanium tetrachloride with butanol:
TiCl4 +  4 HOBu →  Ti(OBu)4  +  4 HCl
The reaction requires base to proceed to completion.

Reactions
Like other titanium alkoxides, titanium butoxide exchanges alkoxide groups:
Ti(OBu)4 +  HOR   →    Ti(OBu)3(OR)  +  HOBu
Ti(OBu)3(OR) +  HOR   →    Ti(OBu)2(OR)2  +  HOBu
etc.
For this reason, titanium butoxide is not compatible with alcohol solvents.

Analogous to the alkoxide exchange, titanium butoxide hydrolyzes readily.  The reaction details are complex, but can be summarized with this balanced equation.
Ti(OBu)4 +  2 H2O   →    TiO2  +  4 HOBu
Pyrolysis also affords the dioxide:
Ti(OBu)4  →    TiO2  +  2 Bu2O

Reactions and hazard 
 
Tetrabutyl orthotitanate reacts with alkylcyclosiloxanes. With ocatamethylcyclotetrasiloxane it produces dibutoxydimethylsilane, 1,5-dibutoxyhexamethyltrisiloxane, 1,7-dibutoxyoctamethyltetrasiloxane, 1,3-dibutoxytetramethyldisiloxane and polymers. With hexamethylcyclotrisiloxane it also produces dibutoxydimethylsilane.

References

Titanium(IV) compounds
Alkoxides